Monte Tanarello (Italian) or Mont Tanarel (French) is a 2094 metres high mountain located on the French-Italian border.

Etymology 
Tanarello is the diminutive form of Tanaro, the main right-hand tributary of river Po. The river rises between Monte Saccarello and Monte Tanarello as a stream named Tanarello and becomes Tanaro after receiving the waters of another stream called Negrone.

History 
The mountain up to World War II was totally belonging to Italy but, following the Paris Peace Treaties, signed in February 1947, is now shared between Italy and France.

Geography 

The mountain stands on the main chain of the Alps between Passo Tanarello (2042 m) and Passo Basera (2036 m). Its Italian side belongs to the province of Cuneo, in Piedmont (Tanaro valley), and the French one to Alpes-Maritimes, in the Provence-Alpes-Côte d'Azur (Roya valley).

SOIUSA classification 
According to the SOIUSA (International Standardized Mountain Subdivision of the Alps) the mountain can be classified in the following way:
 main part = Western Alps
 major sector =  South Western Alps
 section = Ligurian Alps
 subsection = Alpi del Marguareis
 supergroup = Catena del Saccarello
 group = Gruppo del Monte Saccarello
 subgroup = Nodo del Monte Saccarello
 code = I/A-1.II-A.1.a

Environment 
The eastern side of the mountain is gentle and grassy while the western one is a little more rocky and steep.

Access to the summit 
The mountain is easily accessible by  unmarked traks departing from Passo Tanarello or Passo Basera. The summit can also be accessed by mountain bike or with snowshoes.

Mountain huts 
 Rifugio Sanremo (2,054 m)

References

France–Italy border
International mountains of Europe
Mountains of the Ligurian Alps
Mountains of Piedmont
Mountains of Alpes-Maritimes
Two-thousanders of Italy
Two-thousanders of France
Mountains partially in France